Chad Hamilton (born October 21, 1991) is a retired American football offensive guard / center. He played college football at Coastal Carolina. After going undrafted in the 2015 NFL Draft, he was signed as an undrafted free agent by the Chicago Bears. Before the start of the Bears' 2015 training camp, Hamilton announced his retirement.

College career
A four-year starter, Hamilton redshirted and started at left guard in 2011 before kicking out to left tackle. He started every game there the last three seasons, earning consensus All-American honors as a senior in 2014 - three-time All-Big South honors the last three years.

Professional career

2015 NFL Draft

Chicago Bears
After going undrafted in the 2015 NFL Draft, he signed with the Chicago Bears. Hamilton later retired during the offseason that year.

References

External links
http://www.nfl.com/player/chadhamilton/2553530/profile
http://www.goccusports.com/sports/m-footbl/mtt/chad_hamilton_586987.html
https://web.archive.org/web/20150725131454/http://www.afca.com/article/article.php?id=2578
http://www.nfl.com/news/story/0ap3000000483683/article/coastal-carolinas-hamilton-is-a-*lateround-possibility

1991 births
Living people
Coastal Carolina Chanticleers football players